Private Investigations: The Best of Dire Straits & Mark Knopfler is the third compilation album by Dire Straits and British singer-songwriter and guitarist Mark Knopfler, released in 2005 by Mercury and Vertigo internationally, and Warner Bros. in the United States. Named after their 1982 hit single, the album consists of material by Dire Straits, with songs selected from the group's six studio albums (excluding the 1979 album Communiqué) from 1978 up through the group's dissolution in 1995. It also features work from the solo career of the group's singer, songwriter, and guitarist Mark Knopfler, including some of his soundtrack material.

The only previously unreleased track on the album is "All the Roadrunning", a duet with country music singer Emmylou Harris. It was released as a single, reaching #8 in the UK. The United States version omits "Darling Pretty", but adds "Skateaway".

Release
Private Investigations was released in four different versions:
A single disc (grey cover)
A two-disc compilation (blue cover)
A two-disc compilation with a booklet (gold cover)
A two-disc LP with tracks from the single disc CD version

Critical reception

In his review for AllMusic, Thom Jurek gave the album four out of five stars, writing, "This is not only a fine collection for fans because of its wonderful sequencing, but the best introduction to the man and the band that one could ask for."

Track listing
All songs were written by Mark Knopfler, except where indicated.

Single disc version

Two-disc version
Disc one

Disc two

Two-disc American version
Disc one

Disc two

Charts

Weekly charts

Year-end charts

Certifications

References

External links
 Private Investigations at Mark Knopfler official website

Dire Straits albums
2005 greatest hits albums
Vertigo Records compilation albums
Warner Records compilation albums
Mark Knopfler albums
Albums produced by Mark Knopfler
Split albums
Mercury Records compilation albums